Coldplay Live 2012 is the collective name for the official documentation of the Mylo Xyloto Tour, performed, recorded and released by British alternative rock band Coldplay. The project consists of a worldwide theatrical and home media film release, Coldplay's third live album, after Coldplay Live 2003 and LeftRightLeftRightLeft, and a 183-page e-book depicting the tour. The film and album were recorded over many dates over the 2011 Festival Tour and the Mylo Xyloto Tour beginning in October 2011 and ending in September 2012. The film was opened for one night only on 13 November 2012, at select cinemas around the world. The DVD and Blu-ray release of the film and the live album release occurred on 14 November 2012.

Release and promotion
The film was first announced by Phil Harvey in April 2012. It was first announced under the title "ColdplayFilm". The name was also inscribed on the Xylobands used on the Mylo Xyloto Tour between April and September 2012. The film/album was first officially announced on 25 September 2012. On the same day, two websites promoting Live 2012 launched. One promoting the theatrical release of the film, and one promoting the project in general. A two-minute trailer accompanied the announcement, released online and shown in theaters attached to other films as well. In addition, an exclusive preview of "Us Against the World" was shown on the Live 2012 website, as well as another select track off the film of user's choice. A 183-page e-book documenting the tour was also announced.

Live 2012 was first released as an exclusive, one-night-only theatrical release, shown in cinemas across 57 countries around the world. The film opened at 7:00pm at respective time zones (7:30pm at some screenings), on 13 November 2012. The film was shown twice on the night, closing before midnight. A partnership deal between Parlophone and Studio 3 saw the screening of Live 2012 on US premium cable television as well. The film aired exclusively on 14 November 2012 on Epix, the night after the theatrical release and a week before its commercial release in the United States.

Reception

Critical reception
Live 2012 has received large critical acclaim. Adam Silverstein wrote an overwhelmingly positive review for Digital Spy, saying that the film/album was pulled off well amidst mixed reputation, writing "One (thankfully first-class) collab with a popstar and an appearance on The X Factor later, however, and they almost fucked their rep… Chris Martin bawling backing vocals to the Little Mix girls would have been uglier than Javier Bardem toothless in Skyfall, yet that's all it would have taken." He also says it showcases well the "ridiculous effort that goes in to each and every concert." and that the film/album "skilfully showcases just how incredible an adventure it is to observe a world-beating band at the top of their game. And those still to be converted to the Coldplay cause even after watching this? Well, they can f*** off, then."

Drew Taylor of IndieWire wrote a similar very positive review, praising the Mylo Xyloto tour itself as well, and stating that "even a cursory understanding of what it's like to watch Coldplay live is better than nothing at all. Wristbands not included". Sarah Milton of The Upcoming wrote a very positive review focusing on the band's ability to connect with their fans through Live 2012, writing that "This release of their previous and current work defines their unstoppable prowess by taking tracks to a personal level with their fans. This is a skill not many achieve live, but with this album, Coldplay succeeds. It deserves immense recognition, and we can rest assured that Coldplay will keep raising the bar of stadium rock shows for years to come."

Cameron Adams of the Australian Herald Sun gave the album a positive review, highlighting the emulation of the tour, stating "this is the exact show Coldplay are in the midst of charming our country with - wristbands, hits, banter, yoga moves and all!". He also complimented the tracklist choice, writing that "Their biggest hits (Paradise, Viva La Vida, Fix You) sit nicely with their more subversive ones (Violet Hill, Every Teardrop Is a Waterfall)". It was the album of the week in the Herald Sun.

Jim Pusey wrote a positive review for Contactmusic, praising the film for its visual effects and cinematography. He compared it to the band's Live 2003, noticing "a band that's now less awkward and self-conscious." He also gave a positive note to the documentary itself, stating that the most interesting parts were the "behind the scenes interludes that punctuate the performances. Each band member has an opportunity to reveal not only their enthusiasm for playing live around the globe, but also their perspective on the different elements that have made up the tour [...]. This peek behind the curtain is beneficial as it makes the gig footage from 3 different stops on the tour (including their most recent Glastonbury headline set) more engaging."

Kenji Lloyd of HeyUGuys! wrote that the film "goes above and beyond any ordinary concert film, which is just what you’d expect from a band that isn’t any ordinary band. They go the further mile, always looking to take things further, do things better, make the extra effort. As the band plays through the darkening night, we’re treated to the equally impressive artwork and handwritten lyrics that are a part of their live shows, appearing on the screen itself in a fantastic bleeding of creativity." The album was nominated for Classic Pop/Rock Album of the Year at the Hungarian Music Awards and the video got shortlisted for Best Music Film at the 56th Grammy Awards.

Track listing
All songs written and performed by Guy Berryman, Jonny Buckland, Will Champion, and Chris Martin.

Sample credits
"Every Teardrop Is a Waterfall" incorporates elements of "Ritmo De La Noche" written by Alex Christensen, Harry Castioni, Bela Lagonda and Jeff Wycombe, which incorporates elements of "I Go to Rio" written by Peter Allen and Adrienne Anderson.
"Princess of China" features a sample from "Takk..." written by Jón Þór Birgisson, Orri Páll Dýrason, Georg Hólm and Kjartan Sveinsson, performed by Sigur Rós.
"Up with the Birds" features a sample from "Driven by You" by Brian May. It also includes a lyrical sample from "Anthem" by Leonard Cohen.

Personnel
Coldplay
 Guy Berryman - bass guitar, backing vocals, keyboards
 Jonny Buckland - lead guitar, backing vocals, keyboards
 Will Champion - drums, backing vocals, acoustic guitar, keyboard, electronic drums
 Chris Martin - lead vocals, acoustic guitar, piano, rhythm guitar on "God Put a Smile Upon Your Face" and "Don't Let It Break Your Heart"

Additional musicians
 Rihanna - vocals (on "Princess of China")

Technical
 Rik Simpson - mixing
 Olga Fitzroy - additional mixing
 Christian Green - additional mixing assistant
 Bob Ludwig - mastering
 Jon Hopkins - additional film music

Visual crew
 Paul Dugdale - director
 Jim Parsons - producer
 Dave Holmes, Phil Harvey, Juke Jakobek, Stefan Demetriou, Arlene Moon - executive producers
 Brett Turnball, James Tonkin - directors of photography
 Simon Bryant, Tim Thopsett, Tom Watson - editors
 Janet Fraser Crook - director (Glastonbury footage)
 Alison Howe - producer (Glastonbury footage)
 Ben Chadis, Mark Cooper - executive producers (Glastonbury footage)

Art
 Tappin Gofton - artwork designer and director
 Paris, Misty Buckley, Reggie Matheson - front cover
 Matt Miller, Benjamin Etridge, Eric Schleicher, Xavi Menas, Wendy Marvel, Sarah Lee, Nick Pickles, Phil Harvey - photos

Live crew
 Paul Narmandale - design
 Phil Harvey - director
 Misty Buckley - stage and prop design
 Paris, Gwen Liby, Misty Buckley, Reggie Matheson, Lynden Mallinson - painting

Charts

Weekly charts

Year-end charts

Certifications

Release history

References

External links
 The official website for the Live 2012 project.
 The promotional website for the Theatrical release of Live 2012.
 Live 2012 on Discogs.

2012 films
2012 live albums
2012 video albums
Capitol Records live albums
Coldplay live albums
Coldplay video albums
Concert films
Parlophone live albums
Parlophone video albums
Capitol Records video albums
2010s English-language films